Bethke is a surname. Notable people with the surname include:

 Andrew-John Bethke, South African composer
 Arap Bethke (born 1980), Mexican actor
 Bruce Bethke (born 1955), American author
 Des Bethke (born 1943), Australian rules footballer 
 Erik Bethke (born 1972), American computer games developer
 Jean Bethke Elshtain (1941–2013), American political philosopher
 Katie Bethke (born 1988), American soccer player
 Michael Bethke, American murderer
 Penny Bethke (1950–2011), Canadian co-operative business leader
 Sigfried Bethke (born 1954), German physicist

German-language surnames